Karen Denise King (July 6, 1971 – December 24, 2019) was an African-American mathematics educator, a program director at National Science Foundation, and a 2012 AWM/MAA Falconer Lecturer.

Early life 
Karen Denise King was born on July 6, 1971 in Washington, D.C. She was selected for the National Aeronautics and Space Administration Women in Science and Engineering (WISE) Scholars Program at Spelman College as an undergraduate and finished her degree in mathematics magna cum laude in 3 years. King next attended University of Maryland with a National Science Foundation fellowship and earned her Ph.D. in Mathematics Education in 1997. Her dissertation advisor was Patricia F. Campbell.

Professional career 
King began her career as an assistant professor at San Diego State University in 1997. In 1999 she moved to Michigan State University. In 2006 King relocated to New York University as an associate professor. While a professor, King focused her research and publications on urban mathematics reform, the mathematical preparation of K-12 teachers, and mathematics professional development policies. King became the Director of Research for National Council of Teachers of Mathematics in 2011 where she co-authored the book Disrupting Tradition: Research and Practice in Mathematics. She later became a program director at the National Science Foundation of Education and Human Resources. In 2012 she was honored as an AWM/MAA Falconer Lecturer and served on the writing team that wrote The Mathematical Education of Teachers II. King also served as an associate editor for the Journal for Research in Mathematics Education from 2001 to 2004 and was a member of the Mathematics Association of America for nineteen years.

King's work earned her recognition by Mathematically Gifted & Black, where she was featured as a Black History Month 2020 Honoree.

Publications 
Co-Author

 King, K.D., Tate, William F., Anderson, Celia R., (2011) Disrupting Tradition: Research and Practice in Mathematics. Reston, VA:National Council of Teachers of Mathematics

Contributor

 American Mathematical Society. (2012) The Mathematical Education of Teachers II (Cbms Issues in Mathematics Education). American Mathematical Society
 RAND Mathematics Study Panel. (2003). Mathematical proficiency for all students: Toward a strategic research and development program in mathematics education. Santa Monica, CA: RAND Education.

Book Chapter

 Rasmussen, C., Yackel, E., & King, K. (2003). Social and sociomathematical norms in the mathematics classroom. In R. Charles (Ed.). Teaching mathematics through problem solving: It's about learning mathematics. Reston, VA: National Council of Teachers of Mathematics.
 King, K. D., Hillel, J., & Artigue, M. (2001) Technology. In D. Holton (Ed.). Teaching and Learning in University Level Mathematics (Results of the ICMI Study). Dordrecht: Kluwer Academic Publishers.

References

External links 
 MAA Memoriam page
 Karen D King Curricula Vita 2006
 Cadre Bio for Karen D King
 Tribute Wall
 Linked In Profile

20th-century American mathematicians
21st-century American mathematicians
20th-century women mathematicians
21st-century women mathematicians
American women mathematicians
African-American mathematicians
African-American women academics
American women academics
African-American academics
University of Maryland Eastern Shore alumni
United States National Science Foundation officials
1971 births
2019 deaths
20th-century African-American women
20th-century African-American people
21st-century American women
21st-century African-American women
21st-century African-American people